Giacobbe is both an Italian surname and a masculine Italian given name, cognate to English Jacob. Notable people with the name include:

Surname:
Francesco Giacobbe (born 1958), Italian politician 
Gabriella Giacobbe (1923–1979), Italian actress
Luigi Giacobbe (1907–1995), Italian cyclist
Mirko Giacobbe (born 1992), Italian footballer 
Sandro Giacobbe (born 1951), Italian singer-songwriter

Given name:
Iacob Heraclid, also credited as Giacobbe Basilicò or Giacobbe Eraclide (1527–1563), Prince of Moldavia
Giacobbe Cervetto (1682–1783), Anglo-Italian musician
Giacobbe Fragomeni (born 1969), Italian boxer

Italian-language surnames
Italian masculine given names